Norman L. "Dutch" Benefiel (August 31, 1924 – April 12, 2009) was an American politician and excavating contractor.

Born in Newton, Illinois, Benefiel went to the Newton Public Schools. He served in the United States Army during World War II. Benefiel worked as an excavating contractor and lived in Newton, Illinois. He was involved with the Democratic Party. Benefiel served in the Illinois House of Representatives in 1961 and 1962. He died at Richland Memorial Hospital in Olney, Illinois.

Notes

External links

1924 births
2009 deaths
People from Newton, Illinois
Military personnel from Illinois
Democratic Party members of the Illinois House of Representatives
20th-century American politicians